Pingus is an open-source video game programmed by German developer Ingo Ruhnke. It is a clone of Lemmings with penguins instead of lemmings.

Gameplay 
Pingus has 55 levels, grouped into 5 level sets, as well as 21 winter-themed tutorial levels. Pingus 0.7.2 introduced 'levelsets', which are lists of related levels; levels in levelsets usually must be completed in order. However, there are many more levels included with the game not accessible from its GUI, some with entirely different graphics.

Development
Work on the game began in 1998. Version 0.6 was released in 2003 for Linux, and featured new levels and a level editor. On February 11, 2006 the game began being ported from ClanLib to Simple DirectMedia Layer (SDL). On August 27, 2007 version 0.7.0 (the first version to use SDL) was released. In addition to Windows and Linux, the switch to SDL enabled Pingus to be easily built on other platforms, including Apple's OS X. On September 23, 2007 version 0.7.1 was released with a new level editor. On October 31, 2007, version 0.7.2 was released with a set of Halloween-themed levels. There is a Windows 0.7.6 and an Intel OS X binary of 0.7.2 available from the Pingus website. There is a PPC OS X binary of version 0.7.0, while version 0.7.3 contains minor bug fixes that allow the game to work better with the GNU Compiler Collection. The latest version, 0.7.6, adds additional Christmas and Halloween-themed level sets.

In July 2008, the game was relicensed from the GPL-2.0-or-later to the GPL-3.0-or-later.

Reception
This game was the first "Game of the Month" by The Linux Game Tome. Critics were favorable toward Pingus. TechGage named Pingus among the "Top 10 Free Linux games" in 2006. CNN and PC-Welt ranked it as one of the best free games available for Linux. Thinkdigit 2009-05 ranked Pingus among the "Most addictive Linux games". Linux For You September 2009 ranked Pingus 5/5. About.com called it a great game, while acknowledging its debt to Lemmings.

See also 

List of free and open-source software packages
List of open source games

References

External links

 Project home page
 105 playable levels
 Pingus project on gitlab

2003 video games
Fangames
Free educational software
Linux games
MacOS games
Puzzle video games
Open-source video games
Windows games
Video game clones
Video games developed in Germany